Tan Wangsong (born December 19, 1985 in Chengdu, Sichuan) is a Chinese footballer who currently plays as a right-back for Tianjin Teda in the Chinese Super League.

Club career
Tan Wangsong would start his career with Sichuan Guancheng where he would establish himself as the first choice right-back within the team, although he was considered a relatively thin player he endeared himself towards the coaching staff with his vigorous and bold style of play. His time at the club would end when Sichuan Guancheng disbanded and he would transfer to another top tier club in Qingdao Zhongneng. A move to another Chinese Super League team in Tianjin Teda would see him establish himself as an integral member of the team that qualified for their first ever AFC Champions League. He would represent them in their first game in the competition on 11 March 2009 against Kawasaki Frontale in a 1-0 defeat in the 2009 AFC Champions League. 

On 13 June 2009 in a league game that Tianjin Teda was losing 1-0 against Beijing Guoan, Tan was red-carded in the 90th minute for a high tackle against Yang Zhi. Tan would receive a five game ban and along with his red card against Belgium on 10 August 2008 while representing the Chinese U-23 team in the 2008 Olympics, a reputation as a dirty player. Due to his negative reputation and a falling out with the club authorities, he moved to Henan Construction on 12 February 2010.

On 5 February 2015, Tan transferred to fellow Chinese Super League side Chongqing Lifan. On 23 December 2016, Chongqing Lifan officially confirmed that Tan had left the club after a disagreement in negotiations for extending his contract.
On 9 January 2017, Tan returned to Tianjin Teda.

International career
Tan was a member of the China national under-23 football team and played on the team in the 2008 Olympics in Beijing. In an unusual occurrence that received international attention, in the match against Belgium on August 10, 2008, Tan was red-carded for kicking Sébastien Pocognoli in the crotch.

Career statistics 
Statistics accurate as of match played 31 January 2023.

Honours

Club
Henan Construction
China League One: 2013.

References

External links 
Player bio at Sina website
Player profile at doha-2006.com
Player stats at football-lineups website
Player stats at sohu.com
Player profile at sodasoccer.com
 

1985 births
Living people
Sportspeople from Chengdu
Chinese footballers
Footballers from Sichuan
Olympic footballers of China
Footballers at the 2008 Summer Olympics
Sichuan Guancheng players
Qingdao Hainiu F.C. (1990) players
Tianjin Jinmen Tiger F.C. players
Henan Songshan Longmen F.C. players
Chongqing Liangjiang Athletic F.C. players
Chinese Super League players
China League One players
Footballers at the 2006 Asian Games
Association football fullbacks
Asian Games competitors for China